Samia Zaman is a Bangladeshi media personality, filmmaker. She was a television news presenter, reporter and talk show host. In 2006, she emerged as a film director. She also serves as the Editor and CEO of the television channel Ekattor TV.

Career
In 1989, Zaman started out her career as a producer at the BBC World Service in London. Zaman served as a journalist and news presenter in Ekushey Television.

Films
In 1987 Zaman worked in the film Suchona, with the director Morshedul Islam as an assistant. In 2006, she emerged as a filmmaker through her direction on the film Rani Kuthir Baki Itihash. She directed her second film, Aakash Koto Dure, in 2014.

In March 2015, Zaman served in the judge panel of Geneva International Oriental Film Festival.

Personal life
Zaman has three daughters.

Awards
 Anannya Top Ten Awards (2008)

References

External links

Living people
Bangladeshi film directors
Bangladeshi women journalists
Bangladeshi businesspeople
Year of birth missing (living people)